Victor Jacobus Hermans (born 17 March 1953 in Maastricht) is a Dutch futsal coach who has managed 6 different national teams and guided 3 teams to the world cup, Victor Hermans had only two unsuccessful campaign with national teams for the world cup.

Career
Hermans started his career by playing outdoor football for his hometown when he was a teenager. He later moved to Belgium to play for Tongres. After he left Belgium, he moved back into his own country to play for Caesar Beek. He represented his country 50 times and participated in four international tournaments, including the 1989 FIFA Futsal World Championship where his team was runner-up, losing at the final to Brazil.

In 1989, he decided to retire once the world cup had finished in 1990, he joined the Oranje as an assistant coach for two years. After Hermans thought that he was fit to take charge of a team, he was appointed as the Hong Kong manager. He managed Hong Kong in their first world cup as a host nation. Although Hong Kong was a small country but that did not stop them dreaming, thinking they were going to defeat Nigeria and Poland there were many expectations for him to take the team to the next level but they eventually lost in the group stage. 
He later went to manage Malaysia for one year. He left the team after they lost all of their matches in the 1996 World Cup.

After leaving Malaysia he went back to be assistant coach of the Oranje once again, and he did so for three years. He then left and became the head coach of Iran for one year, he managed the team and made Iran with a 100 percent win with the team for seven matches, he made them champions of Asia in 2001 Asian Championship, he then resigned as the manager to manage his native national team. He managed the team for six years, despite the fact he failed to take Netherlands to any world cup but he did take them in to the European championship and one Grand Prix tournament in Brazil after having disappointing results in both tournaments he was sacked as the head coach position in 2007. He later joined Malta as the head coach for two years, but he did not even manage 10 games as the managers, which was a big problem for Hermans and after having to manage getting only 3 points he left the Malta.

Hermans in 2020 reportedly agreed to become the Philippine Football Federation's technical consultant for futsal, helping create a groundwork for the Philippine futsal program including the grassroots level. He would also become coach of the relaunched Philippines women's national team in 2022.

Achievements

Manager
 Iran
AFC Futsal Championship: 2001

 Thailand
AFC Futsal Championship: Runner-up 2012, third place 2016.
Asian Indoor and Martial Arts Games:  Bronze medal 2013.
AFF Futsal Championship: 2012, 2013, 2014, 2015.
SEA Games:  Gold medal 2013.

References

1953 births
Living people
Dutch footballers
Dutch men's futsal players
MVV Maastricht players
Iran national futsal team managers
Futsal coaches
Thailand national futsal team managers
Association footballers not categorized by position
Dutch football managers
Footballers from Maastricht